The Albert R. Broccoli 007 Stage is one of the largest sound stages in the world. It is located at Pinewood Studios, Iver Heath, Buckinghamshire, England, and named after James Bond film producer Albert R. "Cubby" Broccoli.

The stage was originally conceived in 1976 by production designer Ken Adam to house the set he had designed for the interior of the Liparus supertanker in the James Bond film The Spy Who Loved Me. The stage's construction cost $1.8 million. During filming, Adam told American Cinematographer that other filmmakers were interested in using the new "007 Stage". During a ceremony attended by former British Prime Minister Harold Wilson, Roger Moore and other The Spy Who Loved Me actors, and many actors who had worked at Pinewood including Hayley Mills and Kenneth More, Broccoli's wife Dana christened the stage by breaking a champagne bottle on one of the submarines in the film on 5 December 1976. In contrast to the volcano crater set Adam had built for You Only Live Twice in 1966, the 007 Stage was to be a permanent structure that could be rented out to other productions.

It had a maximum  floor space. According to 007stage.com, the water tank was an existing studio feature and the stage was created by constructing a building to completely enclose the tank. Technically, because it had no soundproofing, it was a "silent stage", the largest ever built.

The 007 Stage burnt to the ground on 27 June 1984 towards the end of filming of Ridley Scott's Legend. It was rebuilt, and reopened in January 1985, with the new name, "Albert R. Broccoli 007 Stage", in time for filming to commence on A View to a Kill (1985).

Another fire occurred on 30 July 2006. The fire occurred just after production ended on the Bond film Casino Royale while the Venetian piazza set was being dismantled. Eight fire engines took 90 minutes to bring the fire under control; a spokesman for the local fire brigade said gas canisters may have exploded inside the building. Filming had been completed on the stage several days before and it was being dismantled, so it did not delay production or release of the film. The damage to the building was extensive, causing the roof of the building to collapse. On 31 July 2006, Pinewood issued a statement indicating that the stage "will need to be demolished and rebuilt" and that there had been no casualties in the incident. The fire-damaged stage was demolished on 13–14 September. Construction on the new stage began on 18 September and was completed in under six months. The new stage was redesigned and included a number of new features including an increased working floor space area, enclosed stairwells to the gantry, a vehicle ramp into the tank, aircraft hangar-style loading doors, increased electrical power and better insulation.

An explosion shot in the sound stage on 4 June 2019 caused extensive damage to the external wall of the stage.

Filmed in the 007 stage
 The Spy Who Loved Me (1977): The Liparus supertanker
 Superman: The Movie (1978) and Superman II (1980): Arctic ice floe and exterior entrance to Fortress of Solitude
 Moonraker (1979): Cable car closeups/Special effects model work for the space battle
 Superman II (1980): giant model of Metropolis streets and buildings
 Clash of the Titans (1981): Lair of the Stygian Witches and travelling matte work
 Dragonslayer (1981): exterior of dragon's lair; set built above tank so dragon could burst through the ground
 For Your Eyes Only (1981): The underwater wreck of the St. Georges
 Krull (1983): Swamp
 Octopussy (1983): Hangar explosion/Monsoon Palace courtyard and helipad for a JetRanger helicopter; helipad later removed from the "giant set" and rebuilt outside for landing and takeoff scenes of the  Aérospatiale SA 360 Dauphin helicopter.
 Superman III (1983): Supercomputer cave
 Legend (1984): Forest scene
 Arena (1985): Concert film and the video for "The Wild Boys" by Duran Duran
 Santa Claus: The Movie (1985): Santa's workshop
 A View to a Kill (1985): Zorin's silicon mine, scenes of flooding
 Little Shop of Horrors (1986): Skid Row set 
 The Living Daylights (1987): music video by A-Ha
 The Adventures of Baron Munchausen (1988): The South Seas 
 Batman (1989): The Batcave
 Alien 3 (1992): Blast furnace
 Interview with the Vampire (1994): Theatre of the Vampires
 Mary Reilly (1996)
 Mission: Impossible (1996): Full-size TGV model filmed against green screen for Channel Tunnel chase sequence
 Event Horizon (1997): "Second Containment area" and passageway with globe and rotating spikes
 The Fifth Element (1997): Interior of spaceship, scene of the big shootout
 Tomorrow Never Dies (1997): Interior of Elliot Carver's stealth boat; also, the HMS Devonshire underwater set
 The Avengers (1998): Sir August de Wynter's weather machine
 Still Crazy (1998): Indoor concert
 Joseph and the Amazing Technicolor Dreamcoat: Pharaoh scenes with big Sphinx head 
 The World Is Not Enough (1999): Russian nuclear testing facility
 Lara Croft: Tomb Raider (2001): Stage divided into two: First tomb built on one side, second tomb built on the other side
 Die Another Day (2002): Gustav Graves' Ice Palace
 Lara Croft: Tomb Raider – The Cradle of Life (2003): Stage divided into two: Greek temple built on one side, African caves on the other side
 Alexander (2004): Babylon Palace on one side, Indian Palace on the other side
 Charlie and the Chocolate Factory (2005): The chocolate room with chocolate river
 The Da Vinci Code (2006): The Louvre gallery
 Casino Royale (2006): Venice piazza and interior of sinking hotel.
 Mamma Mia! (2008): Greek fishing village
 Quantum of Solace (2008): Sienese art gallery; cisterns and MI6 safehouse; sink hole; hotel elevator; three levels of walkways and staircases for ECO hotel
 Prince of Persia: The Sands of Time (2010): Alamut castle
 Pirates of the Caribbean: On Stranger Tides (2011): the Fountain of Youth
 Harry Potter and the Deathly Hallows – Part 2 (2011): The Dark Forest
 Intel Ultrabook: Egypt Commercial (2012): New York street and Egyptian street 
 Prometheus (2012): Pyramid entrance, tunnels, and ampule chamber with giant statue head; set was so big that the 007 Stage had an annex added to its north side to accommodate 150 foot sloping incline towards entrance; ampule chamber later revamped to become pilot chamber with "jockey chair"
 Skyfall (2012): MI6's underground headquarters; Shanghai skyscraper atrium and offices with working elevator; underground platform; tunnels; and train crash
 Last Passenger (2013): Three days of pick-up shots.
 Jack Ryan: Shadow Recruit (2013): Water-filled "Wall Street vent facility."
 Maleficent (2014)
 Cinderella (2015): Ballroom; Cinderella's attic
 Everest (2015): Mountainous crags constructed using styrofoam and chips of soap/potato as snow, backed by huge green screens
 Spectre (2015): M's office and corridor; Palazzo Cadenza hall interior; full-scale replica of Westminster Bridge, laid with real tarmac, for full-scale helicopter crash and subsequent scenes.
 Assassin's Creed (2016): United Nations set; Abstergo complex including patient's room, hallway, recreation area, corridor and security room with exposed walls that make it look like it's built within an old Spanish church
 Emmerdale (2016), scenes of Aaron Dingle and Robert Sugden's car submerged in water.
 Star Wars: The Last Jedi (2017): Canto Bight casino
 Solo: A Star Wars Story (2018): Corellian spaceport; Mimban trenches.
 No Time to Die (2021): Mock-up of research laboratory Porton Down. Controlled explosion resulted in partial damage to stage and injury of crew member outside stage

Contrary to some sources (including IMDb), The Living Daylights did not film on the 007 Stage except for a music video by A-ha. Reports that parts of Supergirl were filmed on the 007 stage are not true. The Sulaco cargo bay set for Aliens was built on D Stage, and the frozen lake in Harry Potter and the Deathly Hallows – Part 1 was filmed on A Stage

References

External links
 Official page on 007 Stage

 007 Stage
British film studios
Buildings and structures in Buckinghamshire